The Apartments at 22–24 Collier Road were built in 1929 by developers J.W. Jenkins and J.G. Crockett of the Anjaco Holding Corporation.  The apartments are examples of Mediterranean Revival architecture, with classical details such as Doric columns and a central entrance.

References

Residential buildings on the National Register of Historic Places in Georgia (U.S. state)
Apartment buildings in Atlanta
Residential buildings completed in 1929
National Register of Historic Places in Atlanta